Ansiea is a genus of crab spiders that was first described by Pekka T. Lehtinen in 2004. This genus was named in honour of South African arachnologist Ansie Dippenaar-Schoeman.  it contains two species found in Africa and Saudi Arabia: A. buettikeri and A. tuckeri.

See also
 List of Thomisidae species

References

Further reading

Araneomorphae genera
Spiders of Africa
Spiders of Asia
Taxa named by Pekka T. Lehtinen
Thomisidae